This article summarizes the highlights of professional and amateur golf in the year 2021.

Men's professional golf

Major championships
8–11 April: Masters Tournament – Hideki Matsuyama became the first Japanese male golfer to win a major championship, and the first Asian-born golfer to win the Masters, finishing one stroke ahead of Will Zalatoris.
20–23 May: PGA Championship – Phil Mickelson won by two strokes over Brooks Koepka and Louis Oosthuizen; it was his second PGA Championship victory, and his sixth major championship victory. He is the oldest player to win a major championship.
17–20 June: U.S. Open – Jon Rahm won by one shot over Louis Oosthuizen. It was his first major victory and he became the first U.S. Open champion from Spain.
15–18 July: The Open Championship – Collin Morikawa won by two strokes over Jordan Spieth. It was his first Open Championship victory, and his second major victory.

World Golf Championships
25–28 February: WGC-Workday Championship – Collin Morikawa won by three strokes over Billy Horschel, Viktor Hovland, and Brooks Koepka.
24–28 March: WGC-Dell Technologies Match Play –  Billy Horschel defeated Scottie Scheffler, 2 and 1, in the championship match. It was his first WGC victory.
5–8 August: WGC-FedEx St. Jude Invitational – Abraham Ancer defeated Sam Burns and Hideki Matsuyama on the second hole of a sudden-death playoff. It was his first WGC (and PGA Tour) win.
28–31 October: WGC-HSBC Champions – Cancelled

FedEx Cup playoff events

19–22 August: The Northern Trust – Tony Finau defeated Cameron Smith in a playoff.
26–29 August: BMW Championship – Patrick Cantlay defeated Bryson DeChambeau in a playoff.
2–5 September: Tour Championship – Patrick Cantlay won by one stroke over Jon Rahm.

Other leading PGA Tour events
11–14 March: The Players Championship – Justin Thomas won by one stroke over Lee Westwood for his first Players victory.

For a complete list of PGA Tour results see 2020–21 PGA Tour.

Leading European Tour events
9–12 September: BMW PGA Championship – Billy Horschel won by one stroke over Kiradech Aphibarnrat, Laurie Canter, and Jamie Donaldson. He became the second American golfer to win the BMW PGA Championship (Arnold Palmer, 1975).
18–21 November: DP World Tour Championship, Dubai – Collin Morikawa won by three strokes over Alexander Björk and Matt Fitzpatrick. He also won the Race to Dubai.

For a complete list of European Tour results see 2021 European Tour.

Team events
24–26 September: Ryder Cup – Team USA defeated Europe by a score of 19 to 9.

Tour leaders
PGA Tour
FedEx Cup –  Patrick Cantlay
Leading money winner –  Jon Rahm
European Tour –  Collin Morikawa (5,856 points)
Japan Golf Tour –  Chan Kim (¥127,599,803)
Asian Tour – season extended into 2022
PGA Tour of Australasia –  Brad Kennedy – 2020–21 season
Sunshine Tour –  Christiaan Bezuidenhout – 2020–21 season

Awards
PGA Tour
PGA Player of the Year –  Jon Rahm
Player of the Year (Jack Nicklaus Trophy) –  Patrick Cantlay
Vardon Trophy –  Jon Rahm
Byron Nelson Award –  Jon Rahm
Rookie of the Year (Arnold Palmer Award) –  Will Zalatoris
Payne Stewart Award –  Justin Rose
European Tour
Golfer of the Year –  
Rookie of the Year –  Matti Schmid
Korn Ferry Tour
Player of the Year –  Stephan Jäger

Results from other tours
2020–21–22 Asian Tour
2020–21 PGA Tour of Australasia
2021–22 PGA Tour of Australasia
2021 PGA Tour Canada
Forme Tour
2021 Challenge Tour
2020–21 Japan Golf Tour
2020–21 PGA Tour Latinoamérica
2020–21 Sunshine Tour
2021–22 Sunshine Tour
2020–21 Korn Ferry Tour

Other happenings
20 June: Jon Rahm regained the top spot in the Official World Golf Ranking after winning the U.S. Open, gaining it for the third time, replacing Dustin Johnson.
11 July: Dustin Johnson regained the top spot in the Official World Golf Ranking, gaining it for the seventh time, replacing Rahm.
18 July: Rahm regained the top spot in the Official World Golf Ranking, gaining it for the fourth time, replacing Johnson.

Women's professional golf

LPGA majors
1–4 April: ANA Inspiration – Patty Tavatanakit won her first major by two strokes over Lydia Ko.
3–6 June: U.S. Women's Open – Yuka Saso won her first major in a playoff over Nasa Hataoka.
24–27 June: KPMG Women's PGA Championship – Nelly Korda won her first major by three strokes over Lizette Salas.
22–25 July: The Evian Championship – Minjee Lee won her first major at the first hole of a sudden-death playoff over Lee Jeong-eun. 
19–22 August: Women's British Open – Anna Nordqvist won her third major by one stroke over Georgia Hall, Madelene Sagström and Lizette Salas.

Additional LPGA Tour events
18–21 November: CME Group Tour Championship – Ko Jin-young won for the second consecutive year. She also won the Race to the CME Globe, Player of the Year, and topped the money list.

For a complete list of LPGA Tour results, see 2021 LPGA Tour.
For a complete list of Ladies European Tour results see 2021 Ladies European Tour.

Team events
4–6 September: Solheim Cup – The European team defeated the United States, 15 to 13.

Money list leaders
LPGA Tour –  Ko Jin-young ($3,502,161)
Ladies European Tour –  Atthaya Thitikul (3,591.96 points)
LPGA of Japan Tour –  Mone Inami (¥255,192,049)
LPGA of Korea Tour –  Park Min-ji (₩1,521,374,313) 
ALPG Tour –  
Symetra Tour –  Lilia Vu ($162,292)

Other tour results
2021 ALPG Tour
2020–21 LPGA of Japan Tour
2021 LPGA of Korea Tour
2021 Symetra Tour

Other happenings
28 June: Nelly Korda became the number one golfer in the Women's World Golf Rankings after her win at the KPMG Women's PGA Championship, replacing Ko Jin-young.
25 October: Ko regains number one position from Korda after winning the BMW Ladies Championship.
8 November: Korda regains the number one position from Ko.

Senior men's professional golf

Senior majors
6–9 May: Regions Tradition – Alex Čejka beat Steve Stricker in a playoff to claim his first senior victory in only his third start on the PGA Tour Champions.
27–30 May: KitchenAid Senior PGA Championship – Alex Čejka won his second senior major in his second start.
24–27 June: Bridgestone Senior Players Championship – Steve Stricker won his third senior major by six strokes over Jerry Kelly.     
8–11 July: U.S. Senior Open – Jim Furyk won his first senior major by three strokes over Retief Goosen and Mike Weir.
22–25 July: The Senior Open Championship – Stephen Dodd won his first senior major by one stoke over Miguel Ángel Jiménez.

Charles Schwab Cup playoff events
22–24 October: Dominion Charity Classic – Bernhard Langer won in a playoff over Doug Barron, becoming the oldest winner on the PGA Tour Champions.
5–7 November: TimberTech Championship – Steven Alker won by two strokes over Jim Furyk and Miguel Ángel Jiménez.    
11–14 November: Charles Schwab Cup Championship – Phil Mickelson won by one stroke over Alker.

Full results
2020–21 PGA Tour Champions season
2021 European Senior Tour

Senior women's professional golf
29 July – 1 August: U.S. Senior Women's Open – Annika Sörenstam won by eight strokes over Liselotte Neumann.
26–29 August: Senior LPGA Championship – Trish Johnson won her second Senior LPGA by one stroke over Becky Morgan.

Amateur golf
14–17 January: Latin America Amateur Championship – Cancelled
8–9 May: Walker Cup – The United States team won, 14–12.
21–26 May: NCAA Division I Women's Golf Championships – Rachel Heck (Stanford) took the individual title and Ole Miss captured their first team title.
28 May – 2 June: NCAA Division I Men's Golf Championships – Turk Pettit (Clemson) took the individual title and Pepperdine captured their second team title.
7–12 June: The Womens Amateur Championship – Louise Duncan of Scotland defeated Jóhanna Lea Lúðvíksdóttir of Iceland, 9 and 8, in the final.
14–19 June: The Amateur Championship – Laird Shepherd of England defeated countryman Monty Scowsill after 38 holes.
23–26 June: European Amateur – Christoffer Bring of Denmark won by two strokes over Ludvig Åberg of Sweden.
21–24 July: European Ladies Amateur Championship – Ingrid Lindblad of Sweden won by three strokes over Alexandra Försterling of Germany.
2–8 August: U.S. Women's Amateur – American Jensen Castle defeated Hou Yu-chiang of Taiwan, 2 and 1, in the final.
9–15 August: U.S. Amateur – James Piot defeated Austin Greaser, 2 and 1, in the final.     
26–28 August: Curtis Cup – The United States team won, 12.5–7.5.
3–6 November: Asia-Pacific Amateur Championship – Keita Nakajima of Japan, the number one in the World Amateur Golf Ranking, defeated Taichi Kho of Hong Kong in a playoff.     

Other happenings

Golf in multi-sport events
 29 July – 7 August: Summer Olympics – In the men's tournament: Xander Schauffele of the United States won the gold medal, Rory Sabbatini of Slovakia  won the silver and Pan Cheng-tsung of Chinese Taipei won the bronze after a seven-man playoff. In the women's tournament: Nelly Korda of the United States won the gold medal, Mone Inami of Japan took the silver medal in a playoff over Lydia Ko of New Zealand who won bronze.

Deaths
16 January – Jimmy Powell (born 1935), American professional golfer who had four wins on the Senior PGA Tour.
20 January – Lonnie Nielsen (born 1953), American professional golfer who had two wins on the Champions Tour.
26 January – Bob McCallister (born 1934), American professional golfer who had two wins on the PGA Tour.
19 February – Bill Wright (born 1936), American professional golfer who was the first African-American to win a United States Golf Association national title.
25 February – Lyndsay Stephen (born 1956), Australian professional golfer who had two wins on the PGA Tour of Australasia.
13 March – Rocky Thompson (born 1939), American professional golfer who had three wins on the Senior PGA Tour. 
18 March – DeWitt Weaver (born 1939), American professional golfer who had two wins on the PGA Tour.
23 March – Bob Lewis (born 1944), American amateur golfer who finished runner-up at the 1980 U.S. Amateur.
29 March – Jerry McGee (born 1943), American professional golfer who had four wins on the PGA Tour.
6 April – Al Mengert (born 1929), American professional golfer who played on the PGA Tour.
23 April – Bill Johnston (born 1925), American professional golfer who had two wins on the PGA Tour.
23 May – Lionel Platts (born 1934), English professional golfer.
25 June – Brian Bamford (born 1935), English professional golfer.
16 July – David Snell (born 1933), English professional golfer.
20 September – Billy Maxwell (born 1929), American professional golfer who won the 1951 U.S. Amateur and seven PGA Tour events.
23 September – Bruce Fleisher (born 1948), American professional golfer who won the 1968 U.S. Amateur, one PGA Tour event and 18 Champions Tour events.
24 October - Fredrik Andersson Hed (born 1972), Swedish professional golfer who had one win on the European Tour.
28 November - Lee Elder (born 1934), American professional golfer who won four PGA Tour events and eight Senior PGA Tour events. He was also the first black golfer to play in the Masters Tournament.

Table of results
This table summarizes all the results referred to above in date order.

Notes

References

External links

Men's tours' official sites
PGA Tour (and portal to Champions and Korn Ferry Tours)
European Tour (and portal to European Senior and Challenge Tours)
Japan Golf Tour  (English version)
Asian Tour
PGA Tour of Australasia
Sunshine Tour

Women's tours' official sites
LPGA Tour
Ladies European Tour
Symetra Tour

Rankings
Official World Golf Ranking – updated each Monday
Women's World Rankings – updated each Monday
World Amateur Golf Rankings – updated each Wednesday

 
2021